Camille Chrystal Pourcheresse, known professionally as Camille Rowe, is a French-American model and actress who appeared on the cover of Playboy in 2016.

Early life
Rowe was born in Paris to an American mother, who was a model and dancer at Le Lido club, and a French father, whose family is in the restaurant business. Her childhood was split between France, New York and California.

Modeling career

Rowe was spotted in 2008 at a café in Le Marais, Paris, while studying at university, and became the face of Chloé. She has appeared in magazines such as Vogue Paris, Marie Claire Italia, Madame Figaro, Vogue Italia, Vogue España, and Elle France. She has also modeled for Louis Vuitton, Opening Ceremony, Gap Inc., Abercrombie & Fitch, Tommy Hilfiger, Seafolly, Rag & Bone, H&M, Tory Burch, Ralph Lauren, and Adidas Originals. In 2016, Rowe appeared on the cover of Playboy and walked for the Victoria's Secret Fashion Show.

Personal life
Rowe was in a relationship with Harry Styles from 2017 to 2018. She inspired his 2019 album Fine Line.

Filmography

Film

Music Videos

References

External links
 
 
 

Living people
French female models
Actresses from Paris
French film actresses
21st-century French actresses
2010s Playboy Playmates
French people of American descent
French expatriates in the United States
French expatriates in England
The Society Management models
Age controversies
Year of birth missing (living people)